Aeoloplides is a genus of spur-throated grasshoppers in the family Acrididae. There are about nine described species in Aeoloplides.

Species
These nine species belong to the genus Aeoloplides:
 Aeoloplides californicus (Scudder, 1897) i c g b (California saltbush grasshopper)
 Aeoloplides chenopodii (Bruner, 1894) i c g b (Colorado plateaus saltbush grasshopper)
 Aeoloplides elegans (Scudder, 1897) i c g b (elegant  saltbush grasshopper)
 Aeoloplides fratercula (Hebard, 1919) i c g b (northern coast bush grasshopper)
 Aeoloplides fuscipes (Scudder, 1897) i c g b (southern coast bush grasshopper)
 Aeoloplides minor (Bruner, 1904) i c g b (little saltbush grasshopper)
 Aeoloplides rotundipennis Wallace, 1955 i c g b (Rio Grande saltbush grasshopper)
 Aeoloplides tenuipennis (Scudder, 1897) i c g b (narrow-winged saltbush grasshopper)
 Aeoloplides turnbulli (Thomas, 1872) i c g b (thistle grasshopper)
Data sources: i = ITIS, c = Catalogue of Life, g = GBIF, b = Bugguide.net

References

Further reading

External links

 

Melanoplinae
Articles created by Qbugbot